Tsukuyomi may refer to:

 Tsukuyomi-no-Mikoto (月読), a moon god in Shinto and Japanese mythology
 10412 Tsukuyomi, an asteroid from the asteroid belt.
 Tsukuyomi: Moon Phase, a manga and anime series
 Tsukuyomi (月読, "moon reader"), a jutsu used by Itachi Uchiha in the Naruto manga and anime series
 Tsukuyomi (Negima! Magister Negi Magi), a character in the manga series Negima!
 Ikuto Tsukiyomi, a fictional character from the manga series Shugo Chara! by Peach-Pit. Older brother of Utau Tsukiyomi
 Utau Tsukiyomi, a fictional character from the manga series Shugo Chara! by Peach-Pit. Younger sister of Ikuto Tsukiyomi
 Komoe Tsukuyomi, a fictional character from the light novel Toaru Majutsu no Index.
 Tsukuyomi, a Yu-Gi-Oh! card monster created by Kazuki Takahashi.
 Tsukuyomi, a fictional character from Tsubasa: Reservoir Chronicle whose real name is Princess Tomoyo. She has an older sister whose name is  Amaterasu. 
 Tsukuyomi, a fictional character from the anime series My Hero Academia, The Jet-Black Hero, Tsukuyomi is the alias of Fumikage Tokoyami